Capstick may refer to:

 Capstick (surname)
 .470 Capstick, a rifle cartridge 
 Capstick, an unincorporated area in the Municipality of the County of Victoria, Nova Scotia, Canada